Andrew Lees (born 10 June 1985) is an Australian actor. He is best known for his role as Lucien Castle in the CW series The Originals and Damon in Unfriended: Dark Web (2018).

Early life
Lees was born in Melbourne, Victoria, Australia.  He studied at NIDA since 2005 and graduated in 2007.

Career
Shortly after graduating NIDA, Lees began appearing in television in 2008.  His first role was several guest appearances on popular soap opera Home and Away, in which he played Nathan Cunningham, a university student and residential advisor. He has also made guest appearances on television series City Homicide, H2O: Just Add Water, and The Pacific. In 2009, Lees joined new Nine Network series Rescue: Special Ops, his first leading role, playing Chase Gallagher.  His role in the show has earned him notability as an actor.

Lees also appeared in the theatre production of A Midsummer Night's Dream in 2009.

In 2011 Lees featured in a trio of short adverts for the Australian travel company STA Travel Australia STA Travel, titled "Move", "Eat" and "Learn".

In 2014, Lees played drag queen "Peggy", a supporting character in the telemovie Carlotta broadcast in Australia on ABC TV.

Recently, he starred as Lucien Castle in the CW supernatural drama series The Originals.

Filmography

References

External links
 

1985 births
Living people
Male actors from Melbourne
Australian male stage actors
Australian male television actors
National Institute of Dramatic Art alumni
21st-century Australian male actors